Dunhuang Mogao International Airport  is an airport serving the city of Dunhuang in Gansu Province, China. The airport was formerly known as Dunhuang Airport until June 2020.

Airlines and destinations

See also
List of airports in China
List of the busiest airports in China

References

Airports in Gansu
Dunhuang
Airports established in 1982